Sue Donahue is an American politician. Donahue was appointed in 2016 to serve in the Arizona State Senate representing the fifth legislative district as a member of the Republican Party. Donahue replaced Kelli Ward who resigned to run for the United States Senate. Donahue did not run for re-election in 2016 and was replaced by Sonny Borrelli.

References

Year of birth missing (living people)
Living people
Republican Party Arizona state senators